The Aberford Dykes are a series of archaeological monuments located around the valley of the Cock Beck, where it runs just north of the village of Aberford on the border between North and West Yorkshire, England.

The complex consists of three individual earthworks; Becca Banks/the Ridge, the South Dyke, and Woodhouse Moor Rein.

History

The date and function of the Aberford Dykes are not known for sure. It seems likely that the monuments were built at different times, and possibly for different purposes. Becca Banks/the Ridge has a strongly defensive nature, and may have been built to control a ford over the Cock Beck. Becca Banks/the Ridge runs across the Roman road between Castleford and Tadcaster. However the sequential relationship between the earthwork and the Roman road is not known. Some argue the monument was built to defend against a Roman invasion and the road was later built right through it. Others argue the monument was built to protect the road, possibly in the 'Dark Ages'.
Where subjected to archaeological excavation, the monuments have been found to date from or after the late Iron Age, and it would seem they were silting up during the early Medieval period.

Becca Banks/the Ridge is the principal monument in the group. It consists of a bank with a ditch situated on its southern (downslope) side.

The other two monuments are located on the south side of the Cock Beck valley, and do not share the strong defensive characteristics of Becca Banks/the Ridge. For instance, the ditch of the South Dyke lies on the upslope side of its bank.

The Aberford Dykes today

As scheduled monuments, the Aberford Dykes are legally protected. They still have a role in the modern landscape, serving as field boundaries and marking county and parish boundaries. Much of the length of the Aberford Dykes can be walked via the public footpaths that run along them.

References

Sources
 Alcock, L. 1954. ‘Aberford Dykes: the first defence of the Brigantes?’ Antiquity 28. 147-154
 Faull, M. L. and Moorhouse S. A. (eds) 1981. West Yorkshire: an Archaeological Survey to A.D. 1500, 4 vols
 Wheelhouse, P. and Burgess, A. 2001. ‘The Linear Earthworks’ in I. Roberts, A. Burgess and D. Berg (eds) 2001. A New Link to the Past. The Archaeological Landscape of the M1-A1 Link Road. Yorkshire Archaeology 7. 123-148

External links
Historic England.

History of Leeds
Ancient dikes
Linear earthworks
Scheduled monuments in West Yorkshire